Bow Interchange is a busy grade-separated road junction in London, England, on the East Cross Route (part of the A12 road) between Bow, Stratford, and Bromley-by-Bow at a point where the London Boroughs of Tower Hamlets and Newham meet. It is a triple-level junction where the East Cross Route (the A12), Bow Road (the A11 road), and Stratford High Street (the A118 road) meet. The River Lea runs underneath the junction.

The East Cross Route is a major road in East London which runs north to the North Circular Road and south to the Blackwall Tunnel.

Cycling 

Cycle Superhighway 2 CS2 runs from Stratford to Aldgate via the roundabout east to west. Following the deaths of two cyclists at the roundabout in late 2013 and pressure from the London Cycling Campaign, Transport for London began introducing measures to improve safety for cyclists and other road users at the junction.

Public transport
The nearest stations are Bow Church DLR station and Bromley-by-Bow tube station.

References

External links
TfL - Improvements & projects - Bow Roundabout
SABRE - Bow Interchange

Road junctions in London
Transport in the London Borough of Tower Hamlets
Transport in the London Borough of Newham
Bow, London
Bromley-by-Bow
Stratford, London